Bournazel is a commune in the Aveyron department in southern France.

Population

See also
Communes of the Aveyron department

References

External links

Route des Seigneurs du Rouergue 

Communes of Aveyron
Aveyron communes articles needing translation from French Wikipedia